Harpella may refer to:
 Harpella (fungus), a fungus genus in the family Harpellaceae
 Harpella (gastropod), an extinct marine gastropod genus
 Harpella (moth), a moth genus in the family Oecophorinae